Bord-Saint-Georges is a commune in the Creuse department in the Nouvelle-Aquitaine region in central France.

Geography

The Voueize forms part of the commune's southern border.

Population

Sights
 The church of St. Georges, dating from the fifteenth century.
 A war memorial.

See also
Communes of the Creuse department

References

Communes of Creuse